The Indianapolis 500 auto race has used a pace car every year since 1911. The pace car is utilized for two primary purposes. At the start of the race, the pace car leads the assembled starting grid around the track for a predetermined number of unscored warm-up laps. Then if the officials deem appropriate, it releases the field at a purposeful speed to start the race. In addition, during yellow flag caution periods, the pace car enters the track and picks up the leader, bunching the field up at a reduced speed.

Prior to the first "500" in 1911, in the interest of safety, Indianapolis Motor Speedway founder Carl G. Fisher is commonly credited with the concept of a "rolling start" led by a pace car. Nearly all races at the time, as well as all Formula One races even to the present, utilize a standing start.

In almost every year since 1936, it has been a tradition that the winner of the Indianapolis 500 be presented with one of that year's pace cars (or a replica). In most years since 1911, the driver of the pace car at the start of the race has been an invited celebrity, a former racing driver, or notable figure in the automotive industry. Historically, the honor of supplying the pace car was, and continues to be, a coveted honor by the respective automobile manufacturers and a marketing showcase for the particular make/model.

Pace lap formats

1911–1956

The pace car was used to take the starting field on one unscored lap. The field would use the lap to warm up their engines, tires, and then at the conclusion of the lap, at a prescribed speed, the pace car would pull off the track and allow for a rolling or "flying" start. Fisher himself drove the pace car in several early years, but it eventually became an honorary position, with invitations extended to former winners, notable figures in auto racing or the automobile industry. The invited driver was given the honor of "pacemaker," and manufacturers used the honor of providing the car as marketing exposure.

During his tenure as Speedway president, Tony Hulman rode in the pace car nearly every year, immediately after giving the command to start engines. His primary duty was to marshal the start and in some years, his responsibilities included operating a film camera that would be housed inside the car's trunk.

Dating back to the very early years, the pace cars were often painted with special liveries complete with logos, lettering, pinstriping, and other decorative markings. In addition, sometimes flagpoles, lights, and other motoring paraphernalia were installed to further identify the pace car. Most manufacturers used the opportunity to showcase their higher end or luxury models. Since in the early years, the pace car was only used for one lap at the start (and not during caution periods), the need for a high performance machine (i.e., sports car) was not necessarily the top priority. In many years, the pace car was a convertible, which along with increasing the luxury status of the vehicle, it aided in the officials' ability to marshal the start.

1957–1976

In most years through the early 1950s, the pace car led the field around the track for one warm up lap, and then the race began. The pace lap concept was popular with fans, as many drivers commonly waved at the fans and the rolling grid made for spectacular photographs. By 1957, the procedure was changed so the pace car led the field for two warm up laps. This allowed extra time to warm up the engines, oil temperatures, and tires, and allowed the drivers the chance to survey the conditions of the entire track at least once before receiving the green flag. This also allowed the fans on the main stretch (where the largest grandstands are located) to see the entire field parade by one time before the start. Previously only fans on other parts of the track got to actually see the grid go by for photographs and waving.

For the 1957–1958 races, the grid was lined up and exited single-file from the newly constructed pit lane. The two laps allowed the field to properly form up, however, in practice it turned out to be difficult and both races saw incidents at the start. In 1959, the field went back to lining up the grid on the main stretch, and continues to do so to this day.

By the late 1960s, not only would a special driver be behind the wheel of the pace car, but numerous celebrities would be invited to ride along as passengers. Automotive executives, NASA astronauts, reporters from ABC Sports and the IMS Radio Network, and other celebrities were among those invited to ride in the pace car.

In 1971, local Indianapolis Dodge dealer Eldon Palmer was involved in a crash driving the pace car. He crashed into a photographer's stand at the south end of the pit area, injuring several persons. In the years immediately following, the pace car driver utilized would only be an experienced race driver. Former Indy winner Jim Rathmann served six times (and once for caution periods only). Celebrities James Garner and Marty Robbins were chosen in part due to their experience in racing.

1977–present

In 1977, the format was changed to three warm up laps - two "parade laps" and one "pace lap". During the parade lap(s), often several replica festival pace cars join the field, usually carrying celebrities and/or special guest drivers. The 1978 race was the first to feature multiple pace cars on the track during the parade lap. Since 2010, the IndyCar "two-seater" (a retired Indy race car modified with a special passenger seat) has also been at the front of the field, carrying a celebrity or special guest. The non-participating vehicles pull off the track after one or two circuits, and the lone official pace car leads the field on the pace lap. In 2012, it was further expanded to four warm up laps (three "parade" laps and one "pace" lap), coinciding with the introduction of a new engine and chassis formula.

Starting in about 1994, the field was observed to be quite straggled about during the parade lap(s), and often circulated the track single-file. Drivers were known to weave back and forth, sometimes vigorously, in an effort to build up tire temperature. On the final pace lap, the field would finally form up into the eleven rows of three on the backstretch, but oftentimes it was still loose and not in pristine order. This practice was often the subject of harsh criticism from fans and media, especially when the start was strung out single file, breaking tradition. In 2010, officials announced they were going to police the parade and pace laps closer, requiring the drivers to stay in the rows of three during the extent of the warm up period.

In later years, the Speedway began experimenting with using pop culture celebrities driving the pace cars, a change that has met with mixed responses from fans. Racers have taken the position in more recent years. A. J. Foyt drove in 2011, Dario Franchitti drove in 2014, Jeff Gordon, a five-time Big Machine Vodka 400 winner, drove in 2015, and with the new broadcast partner NBC Sports, their motorsport broadcaster Dale Earnhardt Jr., who made 16 Big Machine Vodka 400 starts and a two-time Indiana 250 winning car owner at the Speedway, drove in 2019.

Extra pace laps

1957: A new state-of-the-art pit lane was built. For the first time, the pit area was separated from the racing surface. For 1957–1958, the field was lined up in single file on the pit lane, rather than the traditional 11 rows of three on the race surface. This required the cars to pull away, then assemble into formation. This caused tremendous confusion in 1958, as the front row escaped from the pace car, and the field needed an extra pace lap to assemble before the green was displayed.

1967: The race was red-flagged for rain after 18 laps. The conclusion of the race was moved to the following day. At the time, the pace car was not used for caution periods. However, officials decided to utilize the pace car for the resumption on lap 19. The original pace car driver Mauri Rose drove the car for the restart as well. Two unscored laps (one parade lap and one pace lap) preceded the resumption at lap 19.

1970: Jim Malloy hit the outside wall in turn four as the field was about the take the green flag. The start was waved off, and the next time by, the field was red flagged to clean up the incident. The teams were allowed to replenish a few gallons of used up fuel, and a short time later, the field pulled away for two new pace laps.

1973: A crash occurred as the field was about to take the green flag. The start was red flagged, and the cars circulated around back to the pits. After clean up, the field restarted, with two pace laps before the green flag.

1986: Tom Sneva crashed on the backstretch on the pace lap. The start was waved off, and the next time around the cars were halted on the frontstretch with a red flag. During the cleanup, officials decided to replenish the teams' fuel tanks with 3 gallons of methanol. After that was completed, the field restarted, and took two warm up laps before the green flag.

1992: Additional pace laps were run (unscored) after Roberto Guerrero crashed during a parade lap. Instead of halting the proceedings, officials decided to simply extend the number of warm up laps. The race itself ended up having 85 laps of yellow flag conditions, therefore the fuel allotment did not become a factor.

1997: Additional laps were run (unscored) due to a three-car crash on the original pace lap.

2009: When the field came out of turn four for the start, the field was not well aligned in the eleven rows of three. For the first time in modern history, the flagman decided to wave off the start, by displaying the yellow flag. The lap was not scored. The field re-formed, and received the green flag the next time by, with a slightly better formation.

Caution periods
Through 1978, the pace car was only used at the start of the race, and was not used during caution periods. Since 1979, the pace car has also been used to pack up the field during caution flag periods. The ceremonial driver drove only at the start of the race. During caution periods, when the pace car is utilized to pace the field, a trained official has been the driver. In some cases, the officials utilize two separate pace cars (exactly the same models) one each for the start of the race, and the caution periods.  Currently, the pace car driver for the caution periods is the same driver who drives the pace car for the Indy Racing League during all other events.

Cars

Starting in the mid-1950s, the auto manufacturer who provided the official pace car started selling replica pace cars to the general public. In many cases, the official on-track pace car was modified from its street-legal counterpart. Strobe lights, rolls bars, multi-point harnesses, television camera mounts, two-way communication (for officials), and removing the air conditioning, are among some of the more routine modifications made for the actual pace car. Some official pace cars, however, have undergone extensive performance modifications, including suspension, transmission, or even engine modifications from their production counterpart (the 1990 Chevrolet Beretta is an example of this). Race-duty pace cars may also have the factory fuel tank replaced with a fuel cell, and usually have an on-board fire extinguisher installed. The special edition production replicas available to the public usually come with full paint and "Indy 500" decals, and may be part of a performance package upgrade.

In addition, the track typically is provided with dozens of lower-end ("base model") pace car production replicas (or different makes by the same manufacturer) for use as festival cars throughout the month. Examples of this practice date back to the mid-1920s. The company who provides the pace car also often provides safety trucks for use at the track. For instance, in 1994, the Ford Mustang Cobra was chosen as the primary pace car. Ford Motor Company provided numerous Mustang GTs (a "stripped-down" model) for festival use. In 1996, the Dodge Viper GTS was chosen as the pace car. Rather than providing a fleet of Vipers, Chrysler provided numerous Stratus, Intrepids, and Special Edition Rams for festival use.

The replica pace cars and the festival cars are usually worth significantly less than the actual car used to perform the pace car duties. Few festival cars may actually have been driven on the track. Actual pace cars are rare and most are kept and owned by the Speedway museum and the manufacturers.

Traditionally, the make of the pace car has always been a domestic American brand. In 1991, the Dodge Stealth was originally named the pace car. However, the UAW, along with traditionalists, protested since the Stealth was a captive import built by Mitsubishi in Japan. Shortly before the race, the Stealth was downgraded to be the festival car. The pre-production Dodge Viper RT/10 was substituted on race day.

In 2001 and 2003, trucks were used instead of pace cars. In 2005, a specially restored 1955 Bel Air pace car was commissioned by the Indianapolis Race Committee to celebrate the 50th anniversary of the Chevrolet V-8 engine. Only one car was built and it was displayed and used on the speedway. It differed from the first 1955 track cars in that it was black. The original 1955 Chevrolet pace cars were red and cream two-tone. This car is currently on display at the Auburn Cord Duesenberg Museum in Auburn, Indiana.

Since 2002, Chevrolet has had an exclusive contract with the Speedway to provide the pace car and other official vehicles for the Indianapolis 500. Prior to that, series engine provider Oldsmobile (1997-2001) had a similar arrangement, and provided the pace car three times over a five-year period. Chevrolet has had a contract to provide the pace car for the Brickyard 400 since 1994.

Since 1936, the winner of the race has traditionally been awarded a pace car. In some years, and in most cases for the past several decades, the winner is actually presented with one of the official street-legal pace car replicas.

Pace cars and drivers

Pacemakers (1911–1941)

Pacemakers (1946–1978)

Note: From 1958 to 1963, retired driver Sam Hanks was named "Director of Racing" for USAC, and assumed the pace car duties. No "celebrity" drivers were used during that period.
Note: The car assignments for the 1975 Indianapolis "500" Mile Race had the VIN number for pace car #1 as 4H57H5-H125041 and VIN number for pace car #2 as 4H57H5-H125135. The VIN engine code identifies as a 350 c.i.d (5.7 litre) V8 and was actually the modified 455 c.i.d. (7.5 litre) V8. Additionally, each VIN number for the total of the 55 Buick Century coupe Pace car replicas.

Pace cars (1979–2022)

1998: Professional golfer Greg Norman was originally selected to drive the pace car in 1998. He participated in testing runs in the early spring. However, Parnelli Jones was named a last-minute substitute after Norman was forced to withdraw because of shoulder surgery.
2001 & 2003: Pace truck or SUV
2006: This was before doping scandals erased his sporting records in 2011.  (See Lance Armstrong doping case.)
2008: There were two Chevrolet Corvette pace cars for the 2008 race; a metallic green pace car that runs on E85 driven by Fittipaldi at the start, and a pace car painted to resemble the 1978 pace car that runs on gasoline (used during caution periods)
2011: Donald Trump was initially named the driver, but resigned the honor due to speculation about his candidacy in the 2012 presidential race as well as the negative fan reactions against his selection, including a Facebook campaign.

Two-seater
Starting in 2010, a modified Dallara IR03, converted to a two-seater, has also led the field during the parade and pace lap. Billed as the "Fastest Seat in Sports," it is driven by a former Indy driver, and carries a special passenger. This is featured at many IndyCar Series races.

Multiple appearances

By driver (for start of the race, not caution periods only)

By car 

The process of varying the selection across different models, which existed from 1911 through 2001, has been abandoned since 2002, with all pace cars exclusively provided by the Chevrolet marque since that year.

By manufacturer 
A list of manufacturers and the frequency in which they either provided official pace cars, or one of their vehicles were selected to pace the Indianapolis 500. This list counts all subsidiary marques, current and defunct, from each manufacturer along with vehicles made by a company that later merged with another on the list.

The process of varying the selection across different manufacturers, which existed from 1911 through 1996, has been abandoned since 1997, with all pace cars exclusively provided by General Motors since that year.

References

Pace cars
Lists of cars